is one of the traditional forty throws of Judo as developed by Jigoro Kano. Sasae Tsurikomi Ashi belongs to the first group, Dai Ikkyo, of the traditional throwing list, Gokyo (no waza) , of Kodokan Judo. It is also part of the current 67 Throws of Kodokan Judo.  It is classified as a foot technique, Ashi-Waza.

Technique description
To perform this throw, the practitioner will pull the opponent towards themselves, while blocking the foot to prevent the opponent from stepping, supporting his weight and regaining his balance. When this is done simultaneously with sweeping the opponent's foot backward it is called Harai Tsuri Komi Ashi. the action of the foot is done while pulling so they will also twist, causing the opponent to begin a rotation that, when offset by the foot sweep, will complete the throw.

Similar techniques, variants, and aliases 
English aliases:

Similar techniques:

 Harai Tsuri Komi Ashi: rather than blocking the foot in Sasae Tsuri Komi Ashi, in Harai Tsuri Komi Ashi the foot is swept away backwards.
 Hiza Guruma: when the blocking is done on the knee,  the throw is called Hiza Guruma.

Further reading

Judo technique
Throw (grappling)